Calamalka is a Canadian hip hop and electronic music producer based in Vancouver.

Biography
Born Michael Campitelli, Calamalka released his debut album Shredders Dub in 2004. The album received positive press.

In 2012, he released his sophomore album All the Way Up.

Discography

Albums

EPs

References

Canadian electronic musicians
Musicians from Vancouver
Living people
Year of birth missing (living people)
Plug Research artists